Alyson Books, formerly known as Alyson Publications, was a book publishing house which specialized in LGBT fiction and non-fiction. Former publisher Don Weise described it as "the world's oldest and largest publisher of LGBT literature" and "the home of award-winning books in the areas of memoir, history, humor, commercial fiction, mystery, and erotica, among many others".

History 
Founded in Boston in 1980 by Sasha Alyson, Alyson Publications began in 1990 to sell LGBT-themed children's books, entitled Alyson Wonderland. It was acquired by Liberation Publications in 1995 and sold to Regent Entertainment Media, Inc. in 2008,
and in November, as Alyson Books, named Don Weise its publisher. He has written of his commitment to Alyson's traditional areas of specialisation, but has stated that he is keen also to embrace "more serious nonfiction—particularly in the areas of current affairs, politics, self-help, and autobiography—as well as literary fiction and works by today's most respected LGBT authors."

In 2010, Publishers Weekly announced that Alyson Books would switch to digital
(e-book) publishing only, with plans to convert backlist titles in this fashion. Don Weise left Alyson at that time.

As of 2019, the URL for the Alyson Books website produces a "DNS resolution error" message.

Some books published by Alyson 

 "Gay Old Girls" (ISBN ‎ 1555834760) by Zsa Zsa Gershick (Joshua Irving Gershick)
 "Secret Service: Untold Stories of Lesbians in the Military" (ISBN 0739454234) by Zsa Zsa Gershick (Joshua Irving Gershick)
Death Trick, by Richard Stevenson
101 Gay Sex Secrets Revealed, by Jonathan Bass
How to Get Laid: The Gay Man's Essential Guide to Hot Sex, by Jonathan Bass
Finding H.F., a young adult novel by Julia Watts
Young, Gay and Proud, edited by Sasha Alyson and Lynne Yamaguchi Fletcher
The Dykes to Watch Out For comic strip by Alison Bechdel
 Lesbian Lists: A Look at Lesbian Culture, History, and Personalities by Dell Richards (1990)
The Second Coming: A Leatherdyke Reader, edited by Pat Califia and Robin Sweeney
Melting Point , short stories by Pat Califia
Doing it for Daddy, short stories by Pat Califia
Macho Sluts, erotic fiction by Pat Califia
Doc and Fluff, a novel by Pat Califia
Latter Days, novelization by T. Fabris for the 2003 major motion picture of the same name
The First Gay Pope and Other Records, by Lynne Yamaguchi Fletcher
The Femme Mystique, short stories edited by Lesléa Newman
Pillow Talk, short stories edited by Lesléa Newman
Pills, Thrills, Chills and Heartache, Los Angeles Times bestseller and 2004 Lambda Literary Awards finalist, edited by Clint Catalyst and Michelle Tea
The Lillian Byrd crime fiction series, by Elizabeth Sims
Revolutionary Voices:  A Multicultural Queer Youth Anthology, edited by Amy Sonnie
The Trouble with Harry Hay: Founder of the Modern Gay Movement, by Stuart Timmons
Half-Life, a novel by Aaron Krach
Out on Fraternity Row: Personal Accounts of Being Gay in a College Fraternity, by Shane Windmeyer
Secret Sisters: Stories of Being Lesbian & Bisexual in a College Sorority
Best Lesbian Love Stories, 2003–2005, edited by Angela Brown
Mentsh: On Being Jewish and Queer, edited by Angela Brown
Love, Bourbon Street: Reflections of New Orleans, edited by Greg Herren and Paul J. Willis—winner 2006 Lambda Literary Award for Anthology
Bi Any Other Name: Bisexual People Speak Out, edited by Loraine Hutchins and Lani Kaʻahumanu
The Bisexual's Guide to the Universe, by Michael Szymanski and Nicole Kristal—winner 2006 Lambda Literary Award for Bisexual
Entangled Lives: Memoirs of 7 Top Erotica Writers, edited by Marilyn Jaye Lewis
First You Fall a novel by Scott Sherman, winner of the Lambda Literary Foundation Award, 2009, Best Gay Mystery
Girl Meets Girl: A Dating Survival Guide 2007 by Diana Cage
One Teenager in 10, edited by Ann Heron

References 

 Weise, Don. "Welcome to Alyson Books." Alyson Books. (accessed May 13, 2009).

External links 
 

1980 establishments in Massachusetts
Book publishing companies based in New York (state)
Defunct book publishing companies of the United States
Feminist book publishing companies
LGBT book publishing companies
LGBT-related mass media in the United States
Publishing companies established in 1980